Aimon de Rans was the lord of half of the Barony of Chalandritsa in Frankish Greece from 1311 to ca. 1316. After his victory over Ferdinand of Majorca at the Battle of Manolada, Louis of Burgundy, the new Prince of Achaea, gave the entire vacant barony to two of his Burgundian followers, Aimon of Rans and his brother, Otho. Otho died soon after, and Aimon sold the domain to Martino Zaccaria, Lord of Chios, and returned to his homeland.

References

Sources
 
 

13th-century births
14th-century deaths
Barons of the Principality of Achaea
Medieval Achaea